Hugh Percy, 3rd Duke of Northumberland  (20 April 178511 February 1847), styled Earl Percy until 1817, was a British aristocrat and Tory politician who served as Lord Lieutenant of Ireland under the Duke of Wellington from 1829 to 1830.

Background and education
Northumberland was the son of Hugh Percy, 2nd Duke of Northumberland, and Frances Julia, daughter of Peter Burrell. He was educated at Eton and the University of Cambridge (St John's College).

Political career
Northumberland entered parliament as the member for Buckingham in July 1806. In September of that year he was elected member for the City of Westminster, on the death of Charles James Fox. He declined to fight the seat at the general election two months later, instead being returned for Launceston. In 1807, he offered himself as a candidate for the county of Northumberland in opposition to Charles, Lord Howick (afterwards the 2nd Earl Grey), who declined to contest the seat. Percy was returned unopposed, and continued to sit until 1812, when he was called to the House of Lords through a writ of acceleration by the title Baron Percy.

In 1817, he succeeded his father as Duke of Northumberland. He served as Ambassador Extraordinary at the coronation of Charles X of France in 1825, defraying the expenses thereof himself, and he "astonished the continental nobility of the magnitude of his retinue, the gorgeousness of his equippage, and the profuseness of his liberality".

In March 1829, he was appointed Lord-Lieutenant of Ireland, a post he held until the following year. He was thus in office when the Catholic Emancipation Act was passed, and was pronounced by Robert Peel "the best chief governor that ever presided over the affairs of Ireland."

Other public positions
In November 1834, Northumberland was elected high Steward of the university of Cambridge, holding that honour until 1840 when he was made chancellor of the university.

He played a prominent role in the establishment of the Church Building Society responsible for building the so-called "Waterloo churches" during the early 19th century. He proposed the CBS's formation at a meeting in the Freemasons' Hall, London on 6 February 1818, chaired by the Archbishop of Canterbury. The Society lobbied parliament to provide funding for a church building programme, and parliament subsequently passed the Church Building Act, voting £l,000,000 to the cause.

He also played a part in the development of football in a time when it was a controversial game by providing a field for the annual Alnwick Shrove Tuesday game and presenting the ball before the matcha ritual that continues to this day. Between 1817 and 1847 he held the honorary post of Lord Lieutenant of Northumberland.

Family
Northumberland married Lady Charlotte Clive on 29 April 1817 at Northumberland House. They had no children.

Northumberland died at Alnwick in February 1847, aged 61. His remains were interred in the Northumberland Vault within Westminster Abbey on 23 February.

He was succeeded by his younger brother, Lord Prudhoe. In August 1851, an altar monument to the Duke was placed in St Paul's Church, Alnwick.

See also
 Syon House

References

External links 
 

|-

1785 births
1847 deaths
Alumni of St John's College, Cambridge
Chancellors of the University of Cambridge
303
Knights of the Garter
Lord-Lieutenants of Northumberland
Lords Lieutenant of Ireland
Percy, Hugh Percy, Earl
Percy, Hugh Percy, Earl
Percy, Hugh Percy, Earl
Northumberland, D3
Hugh Percy, 03rd Duke of Northumberland
People associated with King's College London
Founders of association football institutions
Fellows of the Royal Society
Burials at Westminster Abbey
Members of the Privy Council of the United Kingdom
People educated at Eton College